Kirsten Flipkens and Laura Siegemund defeated Viktorija Golubic and Panna Udvardy in the final, 6–4, 7–5 to win the doubles tennis title at the 2023 Hobart International.

Nadiia Kichenok and Sania Mirza were the reigning champions from 2020, when the event was last held, but Mirza chose to compete in Adelaide instead. Kichenok partnered Kimberley Zimmermann, but lost in the semifinals to Flipkens and Siegemund.

Seeds

Draw

Draw

References

External links
Main draw

Hobart International - Doubles
Doubles